The Ajman Oval is a cricket ground in Ajman, UAE. Oval provides outdoor pitches.

The ground is privately owned and first of its kind in the northern region. It was the first turf ground in Ajman with approval from the Ajman Cricket Council and has four turf wickets, a green outfield with the pavilion designed to give it the Arabian style structure. Besides this, there is an international standard  dressing rooms and dugouts,  large side screens, floodlights, digital scoreboards, a mosque, several mounts with barbecue areas and number of palm and neem trees have been planted. The stadium also has a cricket academy, coffee and sports shop well as parking space.

Currently, the stadium has hosted various local tournament like Age Steel Ramadan T-20 Cup and FS T20 Premier League but  Ajman Cricket Council hoping to-get international cricket to city.

Match hosted

Two-day: United Arab Emirates v Oman

Two-day: United Arab Emirates v Oman

References

External links
 Cricketarchive Profile
 Ajman Oval
 Location

Cricket grounds in the United Arab Emirates
Sports venues in the Emirate of Ajman
Multi-purpose stadiums in the United Arab Emirates
Sports venues completed in 2015
2015 establishments in the United Arab Emirates